Noser Mill is an unincorporated community in Franklin County, Missouri, United States. The community is located on the Bourbeuse River, adjacent to Route 185 south of Beaufort.

History
The community was named after John J. Noser, the proprietor of a local gristmill. An early variant name was "Luther". A post office called Luther was established in 1872, the name was changed to Noser Mill in 1902, and the post office closed in 1908.

References

Unincorporated communities in Franklin County, Missouri
Unincorporated communities in Missouri